Li Ling Fung (born 3 January 1986 in Hong Kong) is a former Hong Kong professional football player. He played as a striker or an attacking midfielder.

Career statistics
As of 11 August 2009.

References

External links
 Player information on HKFA site
 Player Information on tswpegasus.com (in Chinese)

1986 births
Living people
Hong Kong footballers
Hong Kong First Division League players
South China AA players
TSW Pegasus FC players
Tai Chung FC players
Association football forwards